The Rape of Ganymede may refer to:

 Ganymede Abducted by the Eagle (c. 1531–1532), a painting by Antonio da Correggio
 The Rape of Ganymede (Mazza) (c. 1575), a painting by Damiano Mazza
 The Rape of Ganymede (Rembrandt) (1635), a painting by Rembrandt
 The Rape of Ganymede (Rubens) (1638–1639), a painting by Peter Paul Rubens

See also
 Ganymede (disambiguation)